Hermershausen is a borough (Ortsbezirk) of Marburg in Hesse.

References

External links 
 https://www.marburg.de/hermershausen

Districts of Marburg
Marburg-Biedenkopf